Willie Turner (born October 14, 1948) is an American former sprinter. Willie resides in his home town of Yakima, Washington, where he has coached sprinting at A.C. Davis High School for many years. He is greatly loved by the local community and works part-time helping middle school children as a security guard for Wilson Middle School. Willie at one time in his illustrious carrier earned the title, for a brief period, as "Fastest Man Alive" for his efforts in the 100, 200, and 4x1 sprints. Among his many accomplishments he has won a silver medal in the 100m dash for the 1967 Pan American games. He was also favored to be a medalist at the Mexico Olympics before suffering a serious injury which effectively eliminated him from the competition. He still holds sprinting records at A.C. Davis High School in Yakima and Oregon State University where he is considered one of the schools best sprinters in the College's history.

External links 
 Profile at trackfield.brinkster.net
 Oregon State University Hall of Fame

1948 births
Living people
Sportspeople from Yakima, Washington
Track and field athletes from Washington (state)
American male sprinters
Athletes (track and field) at the 1967 Pan American Games
Pan American Games gold medalists for the United States
Pan American Games medalists in athletics (track and field)
Medalists at the 1967 Pan American Games